Saint-Pierre-de-Curtille is a commune in the Savoie department in the Auvergne-Rhône-Alpes region in south-eastern France. It is situated near the northwestern shore of Lac du Bourget.

Heritage sites
It is home to a prehistoric pile-dwelling (or stilt house) settlement that is part of the Prehistoric Pile dwellings around the Alps UNESCO World Heritage Site. These dwellings, now submerged in the Lac du Bourget, date from the 4th millennium BCE.

The Hautecombe Abbey, situated on the lake shore, has been a classified monument since 1875.

See also
Communes of the Savoie department

References

Communes of Savoie